The Maginot Line, named after the French Minister of War André Maginot, is a line of concrete fortifications, obstacles and weapon installations built by France in the 1930s to deter invasion by Germany and force them to move around the fortifications. 

The Maginot Line was impervious to most forms of attack. Consequently, the Germans invaded through the Low Countries in 1940, passing it to the north. The line, which was supposed to be fully extended further towards the west to avoid such an occurrence, was finally scaled back in response to demands from Belgium. Indeed, Belgium feared it would be sacrificed in the event of another German invasion. The line has since become a metaphor for expensive efforts that offer a false sense of security.

Constructed on the French side of its borders with Italy, Switzerland, Germany, Luxembourg and Belgium, the line did not extend to the English Channel. French strategy, therefore, envisioned a move into Belgium to counter a German assault. Based on France's experience with trench warfare during World War I, the massive Maginot Line was built in the run-up to World War II, after the Locarno Conference in 1925 gave rise to a fanciful and optimistic "Locarno spirit". French military experts believed the line would deter German aggression because it would slow an invasion force long enough for French forces to mobilise and counterattack.

The Maginot Line was invulnerable to aerial bombings and tank fire; it featured underground railways as a backup. It also had state-of-the-art living conditions for garrisoned troops, supplying air conditioning and eating areas for their comfort. French and British officers had anticipated the geographical limits of the Maginot Line; when Germany invaded the Netherlands and Belgium, they carried out plans to form an aggressive front that cut across Belgium and connected to the Maginot Line.

However, the French line was weak near the Ardennes Forest. General Maurice Gamelin, when drafting the Dyle Plan, believed this region, with its rough terrain, would be an unlikely invasion route of German forces; if it were traversed, it would be done at a slow rate that would allow the French time to bring up reserves and counterattacks. The German Army, having reformulated their plans from a repeat of the First World War-era plan, became aware of and exploited this weak point in the French defensive front. A rapid advance through the forest and across the River Meuse encircled much of the Allied forces, resulting in a sizeable force having to be evacuated at Dunkirk leaving the troops to the south unable to mount an effective resistance to the German invasion of France.

Purposes 
The Maginot Line was built to fulfil several purposes:
 To prevent a German surprise attack.
 To deter a cross-border assault.
 To protect Alsace and Lorraine (returned to France in 1918) and their industrial basin.
 To save manpower (France counted 39 million inhabitants, Germany 70 million)
 To cover the mobilisation of the French Army (which took between two and three weeks)
 To push Germany into an effort to circumvent via Switzerland or Belgium, and allow France to fight the next war off French soil to avoid a repeat of 1914–1918.
 To be used as a basis for a counter-offensive.

Manning 
Maginot Line fortifications were manned by specialist units of fortress infantry, artillery and engineers. The infantry manned the lighter weapons of the fortresses and formed units with the mission of operating outside if necessary. Artillery troops operated the heavy guns, and the engineers were responsible for maintaining and operating other specialist equipment, including all communications systems. All these troops wore distinctive uniform insignia and considered themselves among the elite of the French Army. During peacetime, fortresses were only partly manned by full-time troops. They would be supplemented by reservists who lived in the local area and who could be quickly mobilised in an emergency.

Full-time Maginot Line troops were accommodated in barracks built close to the fortresses. They were also accommodated in complexes of wooden housing adjacent to each fortress, which were more comfortable than living inside, but were not expected to survive wartime bombardment.

The training was carried out at a fortress near the town of Bitche in Moselle in Lorraine, built in a military training area and so capable of live fire exercises. This was impossible elsewhere as the other parts of the line were located in civilian areas.

Organisation 

It was composed of an intricate system of strong points, fortifications and military facilities such as border guard posts, communications centres, infantry shelters, barricades, artillery, machine-gun and anti-tank-gun emplacements, supply depots, infrastructure facilities and observation posts. These various structures reinforced a principal line of resistance made up of the most heavily armed ouvrages, which can be roughly translated as fortresses or big defensive works.

From front to rear (east to west), the line was composed of:

1. Border Post line: This consisted of blockhouses and strong houses, which were often camouflaged as inoffensive residential homes, built within a few metres of the border and manned by troops to give the alarm in the event of a surprise attack and to delay enemy tanks with prepared explosives and barricades.

2. Outpost and Support Point line: Approximately  behind the border, a line of anti-tank blockhouses that were intended to provide resistance to armoured assault, sufficient to delay the enemy to allow the crews of the C.O.R.F. ouvrages to be ready at their battle stations. These outposts covered the main passages within the principal line.

3. Principal line of resistance: This line began  behind the border. These anti-tank obstacles extended from end to end in front of the main works, over hundreds of kilometres, interrupted only by extremely dense forests, rivers, or other nearly impassable terrains.

The anti-tank obstacle system was followed by an anti-personnel obstacle system made primarily of dense barbed wire. Anti-tank road barriers also made it possible to block roads at necessary points of passage through the tank obstacles.

4. They could be single (with a firing room in one direction) or double (two firing rooms in opposite directions). These generally had two floors, with a firing level and a support/infrastructure level that provided the troops with rest and services (power-generating units, reserves of water, fuel, food, ventilation equipment, etc.). The infantry casemates often had one or two "cloches" or turrets located on top of them. These GFM cloches were sometimes used to emplace machine guns or observation periscopes. 20 to 30 men manned them.

5. Petits ouvrages: These small fortresses reinforced the line of infantry bunkers. The petits ouvrages were generally made up of several infantry bunkers, connected by a tunnel network with attached underground facilities, such as barracks, electric generators, ventilation systems, mess halls, infirmaries and supply caches. Their crew consisted of between 100 and 200 men.

6. Gros Ouvrages: These fortresses were the most important fortifications on the Maginot Line, having the sturdiest construction and the heaviest artillery. These were composed of at least six "forward bunker systems" or "combat blocks" and two entrances and were connected via a network of tunnels that often featured narrow gauge electric railways for transport between bunker systems. The blocks contained infrastructure such as power stations, independent ventilating systems, barracks and mess halls, kitchens, water storage and distribution systems, hoists, ammunition stores, workshops and spare parts and food stores. Their crews ranged from 500 to more than 1,000 men.

7. Observation Posts were located on hills that provided a good view of the surrounding area. Their purpose was to locate the enemy, direct and correct the indirect fire of artillery, and report on the progress and position of critical enemy units. These are large reinforced buried concrete bunkers, equipped with armoured turrets containing high-precision optics, connected with the other fortifications by field telephone and wireless transmitters (known in French by the acronym T.S.F., Télégraphie Sans Fil).

8. Telephone Network: This system connected every fortification in the Maginot Line, including bunkers, infantry and artillery fortresses, observation posts and shelters. Two telephone wires were placed parallel to the line of fortifications, providing redundancy in case a wire gets cut. There were places along the cable where dismounted soldiers could connect to the network.

9. Infantry Reserve Shelters: These were found from  behind the principal line of resistance. These were buried concrete bunkers designed to house and shelter up to a company of infantry (200 to 250 men). They had such features as electric generators, ventilation systems, water supplies, kitchens and heating, which allowed their occupants to hold out in the event of an attack. They could also be used as a local headquarters and counterattack base.

10. Flood Zones were natural basins or rivers that could be flooded on demand and thus constitute an additional obstacle in the event of an enemy offensive.

11. Safety Quarters were built near the major fortifications so fortress (ouvrage) crews could reach their battle stations in the shortest possible time in the event of a surprise attack during peacetime.

12. Supply depots.

13. Ammunition dumps.

14. Petrol-engined armoured locomotives pulled supply trains along these narrow-gauge lines. (A similar system was developed with armoured steam engines in 1914–1918.)

15. High-voltage Transmission Lines, initially above-ground but then buried, and connected to the civil power grid, provided electric power to the many fortifications and fortresses.

16.

Inventory

Ouvrages 
There are 142 ouvrages, 352 casemates, 78 shelters, 17 observatories and around  blockhouses in the Maginot Line.

Armoured cloches 
There are several kinds of armoured cloches. Cloches are non-retractable turrets. The word cloche is a French term meaning bell due to its shape. All cloches were made of alloy steel.
 The most widespread are the GFM cloches, where GFM means Guetteur fusil-mitrailleur (machine-gun sentry). They are composed of three to four openings, called crenels or embrasures. These crenels may be equipped as follows: light machine-guns, direct vision blocks, binoculars blocks or  mortars. Sometimes, the cloche is topped by a periscope. There are  GFM cloches on the line. Almost every block, casemate and shelter is topped by one or two GFM cloches.
 The JM cloches (jumelage de mitrailleuses or "twin machine guns") are the same as the GFM cloches except that they have one opening equipped with a pair of machine guns. There are 174 JM cloches on the line.
 There are 72 AM cloches (armes mixtes or "mixed weapons") on the line, equipped with a pair of machine guns and a  anti-tank gun. Some GFM cloches were transformed into AM cloches in 1934. (The aforementioned total does not include these modified cloches.)
 There are 75 LG cloches (lance-grenade or "grenade launcher") on the line. Those cloches are almost completely covered by concrete, with only a small hole to launch grenades through for local defence.
 There are 20 VP cloches (vision périscopique or "periscopic vision") on the line. These cloches could be equipped with several different periscopes. Like the LG cloches, they were almost entirely covered by concrete.
 The VDP cloches (vision directe et périscopique or "direct and periscopic vision") are similar to the VP cloches but have two or three openings to provide a direct view. Consequently, they were not covered by concrete.

Retractable turrets 
The line included the following retractable turrets. 
 21 turrets of  model 1933
 12 turrets of  model 1932
 1 turret of  model 1905
 17 turrets of 
 21 turrets of 
 12 turrets for mixed weapons (AM)
 7 turrets for mixed weapons + mortar of 
 61 turrets of machine-guns

Artillery 
Both static and mobile artillery units were assigned to defend the Maginot Line. Régiments d'artillerie de position (RAP) consisted of static artillery units. Régiments d'artillerie mobile de forteresse (RAMF) consisted of mobile artillery.

Anti-tank guns 
 Canon de 25 mm SA Mle1934
 SA-L Mle1937 (Puteaux) L/72

History

Planning and construction 

The defences were first proposed by Marshal Joseph Joffre. He was opposed by modernists such as Paul Reynaud and Charles de Gaulle, who favoured investment in armour and aircraft. Joffre had support from Marshal Henri Philippe Pétain, and the government organised many reports and commissions. André Maginot finally convinced the government to invest in the scheme. Maginot was another veteran of World War I; he became the French Minister of Veteran Affairs and then Minister of War (1928–1932).

In January 1923, after Weimar Germany defaulted on reparations, the French Premier Raymond Poincaré responded by sending French troops to occupy Germany's Ruhr region. During the ensuing Ruhrkampf ("Ruhr struggle") between the Germans and the French that lasted until September 1923, Britain condemned the French occupation of the Ruhr. A period of sustained Francophobia broke out in Britain, with Poincaré being vilified in Britain as a cruel bully punishing Germany with unreasonable reparations demands. The British—who openly championed the German position on reparations—applied intense economic pressure on France to change its policies towards Germany. At a conference in London in 1924 to settle the Franco-German crisis caused by the Ruhrkampf, the British Prime Minister Ramsay MacDonald successfully pressed the French Premier Édouard Herriot to make concessions to Germany. The British diplomat Sir Eric Phipps, who attended the conference, commented afterwards that: The London Conference was for the French 'man in the street' one long Calvary as he saw M. Herriot abandoning one by one the cherished possessions of French preponderance on the Reparations Commission, the right of sanctions in the event of German default, the economic occupation of the Ruhr, the French-Belgian railway Régie, and finally, the military occupation of the Ruhr within a year. The great conclusion that was drawn in Paris after the Ruhrkampf and the 1924 London Conference was that France could not make unilateral military moves to uphold Versailles as the resulting British hostility to such moves was too dangerous to the republic. Beyond that, the French were well aware of the contribution of Britain and its dominions to the victory of 1918. French decision-makers believed they needed Britain's help to win another war; the French could only go so far with alienating the British. From 1871 forward, French elites had concluded that France had no hope of defeating Germany on its own, and France would need an alliance with another great power to defeat the Reich.

1927: Allied Control Commission abolished 
In 1926, The Manchester Guardian ran an exposé showing the Reichswehr had been developing military technology forbidden by the Treaty of Versailles in the Soviet Union. The secret German-Soviet cooperation started in 1921. The German statement following The Manchester Guardians article that Germany did not feel bound by the terms of Versailles and would violate them as much as possible gave much offence in France. Nonetheless, in 1927, the Inter-Allied Commission, which was responsible for ensuring that Germany complied with Part V of the Treaty of Versailles, was abolished as a goodwill gesture reflecting the "Spirit of Locarno". When the Control Commission was dissolved, the commissioners in their final report issued a blistering statement, stating that Germany had never sought to abide by Part V and the Reichswehr had been engaging in covert rearmament all through the 1920s. Under the Treaty of Versailles, France was to occupy the Rhineland region of Germany until 1935. Still, the last French troops left the Rhineland in June 1930 in exchange for Germany accepting the Young Plan. As long as the French occupied the Rhineland, it served as a type of collateral under which the French would annex the Rhineland in the event of Germany breaching any of the articles of the treaty, such as rearming in violation of Part V; this threat was powerful enough to deter successive German governments all through the 1920s from attempting any overt violation of Part V. French plans as developed by Marshal Ferdinand Foch in 1919 were based on the assumption that in the event of a war with the Reich, the French forces in the Rhineland were to embark upon an offensive to seize the Ruhr. A variant of the Foch plan had been used by Poincaré in 1923 when he ordered the French occupation of the Ruhr.

French plans for an offensive in the 1920s were realistic, as Versailles had forbidden German conscription, and the Reichswehr was limited to 100,000 men. Once the French forces left the Rhineland in 1930, this form of leverage with the Rhineland as collateral was no longer available to Paris, which from then on had to depend on Berlin's word that it would continue to abide by the terms of the Versailles and Locarno treaties, which stated that the Rhineland was to stay demilitarised forever. Given that Germany had engaged in covert rearmament with the co-operation of the Soviet Union starting in 1921 (a fact that had become public knowledge in 1926) and that every German government had gone out of its way to insist on the moral invalidity of Versailles, claiming it was based upon the so-called Kriegsschuldlüge ("War guilt lie") that Germany started the war in 1914, the French had little faith that the Germans would willingly allow the Rhineland's demilitarised status to continue forever, and believed that at some time in the future, Germany would rearm in violation of Versailles, reintroduce conscription and remilitarise the Rhineland. The decision to build the Maginot Line in 1929 was a tacit French admission that without the Rhineland as collateral, Germany was soon going to rearm and that the terms of Part V had a limited lifespan.

German economic superiority 
After 1918, the German economy was twice as large as that of France; Germany had a population of 70 million compared to France's 40 million, and the French economy was hobbled by the need to reconstruct the enormous damage of World War I, while German territory had seen little fighting. French military chiefs were dubious about their ability to win another war against Germany on its own, especially an offensive war. French decision-makers knew that the victory of 1918 had been achieved because the British Empire and the United States were allies in the war and that the French would have been defeated on their own. With the United States isolationist and Britain stoutly refusing to make the "continental commitment" to defend France on the same scale as in World War I, the prospects of Anglo-American assistance in another war with Germany appeared to be doubtful at best. Versailles did not call for military sanctions in the event of the German military reoccupying the Rhineland or breaking Part V, while Locarno committed Britain and Italy to come to French aid in the event of a "flagrant violation" of the Rhineland's demilitarised status, it did not define what a "flagrant violation" would be. The British and Italian governments refused in subsequent diplomatic talks to define "flagrant violation", which led the French to place little hope in Anglo-Italian help if German military forces should reoccupy the Rhineland. Given the diplomatic situation in the late 1920s, the Quai d'Orsay informed the government that French military planning should be based on a worst-case scenario that France would fight the next war against Germany without the help of Britain or the United States.

France had an alliance with Belgium and with the states of the Cordon sanitaire, as the French alliance system in Eastern Europe was known. Although the alliances with Belgium, Poland, Czechoslovakia, Romania and Yugoslavia were appreciated in Paris, it was widely understood that this was no compensation for the absence of Britain and the United States. The French military was especially insistent that the population disparity made an offensive war of manoeuvre and swift advances suicidal, as there would always be far more German divisions; a defensive strategy was needed to counter Germany. The French assumption was always that Germany would not go to war without conscription, which would allow the German Army to take advantage of the Reichs numerical superiority. Without the natural defensive barrier provided by the Rhine River, French generals argued that France needed a new defensive barrier made of concrete and steel to replace it. The power of properly dug-in defensive trenches had been amply demonstrated during World War I, when a few soldiers manning a single machine gun post could kill hundreds of the enemy in the open and therefore building a massive defensive line with subterranean concrete shelters was the most rational use of French manpower.

The American historian William Keylor wrote that given the diplomatic conditions of 1929 and likely trends – with the United States isolationist and Britain unwilling to make the "continental commitment" – the decision to build the Maginot Line was not irrational and stupid, as building the Maginot Line was a sensible response to the problems that would be created by the coming French withdrawal from the Rhineland in 1930. Part of the rationale for the Maginot Line stemmed from the severe French losses during the First World War and their effect on the French population. The drop in the birth rate during and after the war, resulting in a national shortage of young men, created an "echo" effect on the generation that provided the French conscript army in the mid-1930s. Faced with a manpower shortage, French planners had to rely more on older and less fit reservists, who would take longer to mobilise and would diminish the French industry because they would leave their jobs. Static defensive positions were therefore intended not only to buy time but to economise on men by defending an area with fewer and less mobile forces. In 1940, France deployed about twice as many men, 36 divisions (roughly one third of its force), for the defence of the Maginot Line in Alsace and Lorraine. In contrast, the opposing German Army Group C only contained 19 divisions, fewer than a seventh of the force committed in the Manstein Plan for the invasion of France. Reflecting memories of World War I, the French General Staff had developed the concept of la puissance du feu ("the power of fire"), the power of artillery dug in and sheltered by concrete and steel, to inflict devastating losses on an attacking force.

War of long duration 

French planning for war with Germany was always based on the assumption that the war would be la guerre de longue durée (the war of the long duration), in which the superior economic resources of the Allies would gradually grind the Germans down. The fact that the Wehrmacht embraced the strategy of Blitzkrieg (Lightning War) with the vision of swift wars in which Germany would win quickly via a knockout blow was a testament to the fundamental soundness of the concept of la guerre de longue durée. Germany had the largest economy in Europe but lacked many of the raw materials necessary for a modern industrial economy (making the Reich vulnerable to a blockade) and the ability to feed its population. The guerre de longue durée strategy called for the French to halt the expected German offensive meant to give the Reich a swift victory; afterwards, there would be an attrition struggle; once the Germans were exhausted, France would begin an offensive to win the war.

The Maginot Line was intended to block the main German blow if it should come via eastern France and divert it through Belgium, where French forces would meet and stop the Germans. The Germans were expected to fight costly offensives, whose failures would sap the strength of the Reich, while the French waged a total war, mobilising the resources of France, its empire and allies. Besides the demographic reasons, a defensive strategy served the needs of French diplomacy towards Great Britain. The French imported a third of their coal from Britain, and 32 percent of all imports through French ports were carried by British ships. Of French trade, 35 percent was with the British Empire and the majority of the tin, rubber, jute, wool and manganese used by France came from the British Empire.

About 55 percent of overseas imports arrived in France via the Channel ports of Calais, Le Havre, Cherbourg, Boulogne, Dieppe, Saint-Malo and Dunkirk. Germany had to import most of its iron, rubber, oil, bauxite, copper and nickel, making naval blockade a devastating weapon against the German economy. For economic reasons, the success of the strategy of la guerre de longue durée would at the very least require Britain to maintain a benevolent neutrality, preferably to enter the war as an ally as British sea power could protect French imports while depriving Germany of hers. A defensive strategy based on the Maginot Line was an excellent way of demonstrating to Britain that France was not an aggressive power and would only go to war in the event of German aggression, a situation that would make it more likely that Britain would enter the war on France's side.

The line was built in several phases from 1930 by the Service Technique du Génie (STG), overseen by Commission d'Organisation des Régions Fortifiées (CORF). The main construction was largely completed by 1939, at the cost of around 3 billion French francs (around 3.9 billion in today's U.S. dollar’s worth). The line stretched from Switzerland to Luxembourg and a much lighter extension was extended to the Strait of Dover after 1934. The original construction did not cover the area ultimately chosen by the Germans for their first challenge, which was through the Ardennes in 1940, a plan known as Fall Gelb (Case Yellow), due to the neutrality of Belgium. The location of this attack, chosen because of the location of the Maginot Line, was through the Belgian Ardennes Forest (sector 4), which is off the map to the left of Maginot Line sector 6 (as marked).

Features 

Artillery was coordinated with protective measures to ensure that one fort could support the next in line by bombarding it directly without harm. The largest guns were, therefore  fortress guns; larger weapons were to be part of the mobile forces and were to be deployed behind the lines.

The fortifications did not extend through the Ardennes Forest (which was believed to be impenetrable by Commander-in-Chief Maurice Gamelin) or along France's border with Belgium because the two countries had signed an alliance in 1920, by which the French army would operate in Belgium if the German forces invaded. However, after France had failed to counter the German remilitarisation of the Rhineland, Belgium—thinking that France was not a reliable ally—abrogated the treaty in 1936 and declared neutrality. France quickly extended the Maginot Line along the Franco-Belgian border, but not to the standard of the rest of the line. As the water table in this region is high, there was the danger of underground passages getting flooded, which the line designers knew would be difficult and expensive to overcome.

In 1939 U.S. Army officer Kenneth Nichols visited the Metz sector, where he was impressed by the formidable formations which he thought the Germans would have to outflank by driving through Belgium. In discussion with General Brousseau, the commander of the Metz sector and other officers, the general outlined the French problem in extending the line to the sea in that placing the line along the Belgian-German border required the agreement of Belgium, but putting the line along the French-Belgian border relinquished Belgium to the Germans. Another complication was Holland, and the various governments never resolved their problems.

When the British Expeditionary Force landed in France in September 1939, they and the French reinforced and extended the Maginot line to the sea in a flurry of construction from 1939 to 1940, accompanied by general improvements all along the line. The final line was strongest around the industrial regions of Metz, Lauter and Alsace, while other areas were, in comparison, only weakly guarded. In contrast, the propaganda about the line made it appear far greater a construction than it was; illustrations showed multiple storeys of interwoven passages and even underground rail yards and cinemas. This reassured allied civilians.

Czechoslovak connection 
Czechoslovakia also feared Hitler and began building its own defences. As an ally of France, they got advice on the Maginot design and applied it to Czechoslovak border fortifications. The design of the casemates is similar to the ones found in the southern part of the Maginot Line, and photographs of them are often confused with Maginot forts. Following the Munich Agreement and the German occupation of Czechoslovakia, the Germans were able to use the Czech fortifications to plan attacks that proved successful against the western fortifications (the Belgian Fort Eben-Emael is the best-known example).

German invasion in World War II 

The World War II German invasion plan of 1940 (Sichelschnitt) was designed to deal with the line. A decoy force sat opposite the line while a second Army Group cut through the Low Countries of Belgium and the Netherlands, as well as through the Ardennes Forest, which lay north of the main French defences. Thus the Germans were able to avoid a direct assault on the Maginot Line by violating the neutrality of Belgium, Luxembourg and the Netherlands. Attacking on 10 May, German forces were well into France within five days and they continued to advance until 24 May, when they stopped near Dunkirk.

During the advance to the English Channel, the Germans overran France's border defence with Belgium and several Maginot Forts in the Maubeuge area whilst the Luftwaffe simply flew over it. On 19 May, the German 16th Army captured the isolated petit ouvrage La Ferté (south-east of Sedan) after conducting a deliberate assault by combat engineers backed up by heavy artillery, taking the fortifications in only four days. The entire French crew of 107 soldiers was killed during the action. On 14 June 1940, the day Paris fell, the German 1st Army went over to the offensive in "Operation Tiger" and attacked the Maginot Line between St Avold and Saarbrücken. The Germans then broke through the fortification line as defending French forces retreated southward. In the following days, infantry divisions of the 1st Army attacked fortifications on each side of the penetration, capturing four petits ouvrages. The 1st Army also conducted two attacks against the Maginot Line further to the east in northern Alsace. One attack broke through a weak section of the line in the Vosges Mountains, but the French defenders stopped a second attack near Wissembourg. On 15 June, infantry divisions of the German 7th Army attacked across the Rhine River in Operation "Small Bear", penetrating the defences deep and capturing the cities of Colmar and Strasbourg.

By early June, the German forces had cut off the line from the rest of France, and the French government was making overtures for an armistice, which was signed on 22 June in Compiègne. As the line was surrounded, the German Army attacked a few ouvrages from the rear but was unsuccessful in capturing any significant fortifications. The main fortifications of the line were still mostly intact, many commanders were prepared to hold out, and the Italian advance had been contained. Nevertheless, Maxime Weygand signed the surrender instrument and the army was ordered out of their fortifications to be taken to POW camps.

When the Allied forces invaded in June 1944, the line, now held by German defenders, was again largely bypassed; fighting touched only portions of the fortifications near Metz and in northern Alsace towards the end of 1944. During the German offensive Operation Nordwind in January 1945, Maginot Line casemates and fortifications were utilised by Allied forces, especially in the Bas-Rhin department in Grand Est, and some German units had been supplemented with flamethrower tanks in anticipation of this possibility. Stephen Ambrose wrote that in January 1945, "a part of the line was used for the purpose it had been designed for and showed what a superb fortification it was." Here the Line ran east-west, around the villages of Rittershoffen and Hatten, south of Wissembourg.

After World War II 

After the war, the French re-manned the line and underwent some modifications. With the advent of French nuclear weapons in the early 1960s, the line became an expensive anachronism. Some of the larger ouvrages were converted to command centres. When France withdrew from NATO's military component in 1966, much of the line was abandoned, with the NATO facilities turned back over to French forces and the rest of it auctioned off to the public or left to decay. A number of old fortifications have now been turned into wine cellars, a mushroom farm, and even a disco. Besides that, a few private houses are built atop some blockhouses.

Ouvrage Rochonvillers was retained by the French Army as a command centre into the 1990s but was deactivated following the disappearance of the Soviet threat. Ouvrage Hochwald is the only facility in the main line that remains in active service as a hardened command facility for the French Air Force known as Drachenbronn Airbase.

In 1968, when scouting locations for On Her Majesty's Secret Service, producer Harry Saltzman used his French contacts to gain permission to use portions of the Maginot Line as SPECTRE headquarters in the film. Saltzman provided art director Syd Cain with a tour of the complex. Still, Cain said that the location would be challenging to light and film inside and that artificial sets could be constructed at the studios for a fraction of the cost. The idea was shelved.

Postwar assessment 
In analysing the Maginot Line, Ariel Ilan Roth summarised its main purpose: it was not "as popular myth would later have it, to make France invulnerable", but it was constructed "to appeal flanking far outweigh the appeal of attacking them head on". J.E. Kaufmann and H.W. Kaufmann added that before construction in October 1927, the Superior Council of War adopted the final design for the line and identified that one of the main missions would be to deter a German cross-border assault with only minimal force to allow "the army time to mobilise." In addition, the French envisioned that the Germans would conduct a repeat of their First World War battle plan to flank the defences and drew up their overall strategy with that in mind. 

Julian Jackson highlighted one of the line's roles was to facilitate that strategy by "free[ing] manpower for offensive operations elsewhere... and to protect the forces of manoeuvre"; the latter included a more mechanised and modernised military, which would advance into Belgium and engage the German main thrust flanking the line. In support, Roth commented that the French strategy envisioned one of two possibilities by advancing into Belgium: "either there would be a decisive battle in which France might win, or, more likely, a front would develop and stabilise". The latter meant the next war's destructive consequences would not take place on French soil.

Postwar assessment of whether the Maginot Line served its purpose has been mixed. Its enormous cost and its failure to prevent German forces from invading France have caused journalists and political commentators to remain divided on whether the line was worthwhile. 

The historian Clayton Donnell commented, "If one believes the Maginot Line was built for the primary purpose of stopping a German invasion of France, most will consider it a massive failure and a waste of money... in reality, the line was not built to be the ultimate saviour of France". Donnell argued that the primary purpose of "prevent[ing] a concerted attack on France through the traditional invasion routes and to permit time for the mobilisation of troops... was fulfiled", as was the French strategy of forcing the Germans to enter Belgium, which ideally would have allowed "the French to fight on favourable terrain". However, he noted that the French failed to use the line as the basis for an offensive. 

Marc Romanych and Martin Rupp highlight that "poor decisions and missed opportunities" plagued the line and point to its purpose of conserving manpower: "about 20 percent of [France's] field divisions remained inactive along the Maginot Line". Belgium was overrun, and British and French forces evacuated at Dunkirk. They argue had those troops been moved north, "it is possible that Heeresgruppe A's advance could have been blunted, giving time for Groupe d'armees 1 to reorganise". Kaufmann and Kaufmann commented, "When all is said and done, the Maginot Line did not fail to accomplish its original mission... it provided a shield that bought time for the army to mobilise... [and] concentrate its best troops along the Belgian border to engage the enemy."

The psychological factor of the Maginot Line has also been discussed. Its construction created a false sense of security, which was widely believed by the French population. Kaufmann and Kaufmann comment that it was an unintended consequence of André Maginot's efforts to "focus the public's attention on the work being done, emphasising the role and nature of the line". That resulted in "the media exaggerating their descriptions by turning the line into an impregnable fortified position that would seal the frontier". The false sense of security contributed "to the development of the "Maginot mentality".

Jackson commented that "it has often been alleged that the Maginot Line contributed to France's defeat by making the military too complacent and defence-minded. Such accusations are unfounded". Historians have pointed to numerous reasons for the French defeat: faulty strategy and doctrine, dispersion of forces, the loss of command and control, poor communications, faulty intelligence that provided excessive German numbers, the slow nature of the French response to the German penetration of the Ardennes and a failure to understand the nature and speed of the German doctrine. More seriously, historians have noted rather than the Germans doing what the French had envisioned, the French played into the Germans' hand, culminating in their defeat.

When the French Army failed in Belgium, the Maginot Line covered their retreat. Romanych and Rupp indicate that except for the loss of several insignificant fortifications from insufficient defending troops, the actual fortifications and troops "withstood the test of battle", repulsed numerous attacks, and "withstood intense aerial and artillery bombardment". Kaufmann and Kaufmann point to the Maginot Line along the Italian border, which "demonstrated the effectiveness of the fortifications... when properly employed".

Cultural impact
The term "Maginot Line" has become a part of the English language: "America's Maginot Line" was the title used for an Atlantic Magazine article about America's military bases in Asia. The article portrayed vulnerability by showing a rocket being transported through a marshy area atop an ox. New York Times headlined "Maginot Line in the Sky" in 2000 and "A New Maginot Line" in 2001. It was also frequently referenced in wartime films, notably Thunder Rock, The Major and the Minor (albeit as a comedic metaphor) and Passage to Marseille.

Somewhat like "line in the sand" it is also used in non-military situations, as in "Reagan's budgetary Maginot Line."

See also

 Atlantic Wall
 Bar Lev Line
 Czechoslovak border fortifications
 British hardened field defences of World War II
 Ceintures de Lyon
 List of Alpine Line ouvrages (works)
 List of Maginot Line ouvrages (works)
 Metaxas Line
 Rupnik Line
 Siegfried Line
 Commission for Organising the Fortified Regions (CORF)
 K-W Line – a contemporary defence line in Belgium

Notes 
 Footnotes

 Citations

References 
Books

 
 
 
 
 Donnell, Clayton. The Battle for the Maginot Line, 1940 (Pen and Sword, 2017).</ref>
 
 
 
 
 
 
 
 
 
 
 

Journals

Further reading 
 Mary, Jean-Yves; Hohnadel, Alain; Sicard, Jacques. Hommes et Ouvrages de la Ligne Maginot, Tome 1. (Men and Works of the Maginot Line). Paris, Histoire & Collections, 2001. . 
 Mary, Jean-Yves; Hohnadel, Alain; Sicard, Jacques. Hommes et Ouvrages de la Ligne Maginot, Tome 2. Paris, Histoire & Collections, 2003. . 
 Mary, Jean-Yves; Hohnadel, Alain; Sicard, Jacques. Hommes et Ouvrages de la Ligne Maginot, Tome 3. Paris, Histoire & Collections, 2003. . 
 Mary, Jean-Yves; Hohnadel, Alain; Sicard, Jacques. Hommes et Ouvrages de la Ligne Maginot, Tome 4 – La fortification alpine. Paris, Histoire & Collections, 2009. . 
 Mary, Jean-Yves; Hohnadel, Alain; Sicard, Jacques. Hommes et Ouvrages de la Ligne Maginot, Tome 5. Paris, Histoire & Collections, 2009. . 
 
 Kaufmann, J.E., Kaufmann, H.W., Jancovič-Potočnik, A. and Lang, P. The Maginot Line: History and Guide, Pen and Sword, 2011.

External links 

  The Maginot Line (French/English/German/Italian)
  Fortress of Schoenenbourg, (French/English/German/Italian)
 The U.S. Army vs. The Maginot Line by Bryan J. Dickerson
 Maginot Line today
  Armament of Maginot Line (Czech only)

 
World War II defensive lines
Historic defensive lines
Tunnel warfare
Separation barriers
20th-century fortifications
Military installations established in 1930
1930 establishments in France